is the Japanese name for the Eurasian skylark.

Hibari may also refer to:


People
Hibari Misora (美空 ひばり, 1937–1989), Japanese singer and actress

Fictional characters
Hibari, a character in the video game series Senran Kagura
Hibari Ōzora, the title character of the manga series Stop!! Hibari-kun!
Kyoya Hibari, a character in the manga series Reborn!

Places
Hibari Station, a Japanese railway station
Studio Hibari, a Japanese animation studio

Other uses
Hibari (database), a NoSQL database
Hibari (satellite), a proposed space telescope to test a stable orientation method

See also

 Hybari (pronounced the same), also known as the FV-E991 series, a hydrogen fuel cell and Li-ion battery hybrid train operated by JR East

Japanese feminine given names